Henry Edward Fox-Strangways, 5th Earl of Ilchester PC (13 February 1847 – 6 December 1905), known as Henry Fox-Strangways until 1865, was a British peer and Liberal politician. He served as Captain of the Honourable Corps of Gentlemen-at-Arms under William Ewart Gladstone between January and February 1874.

Origins
He was the son of John Fox-Strangways, fourth son of Henry Thomas Fox-Strangways, 2nd Earl of Ilchester. His mother was Amelia Marjoribanks, daughter of Edward Marjoribanks.  In 1874 he inherited the Holland House estate in London from his distant cousin Baron Holland.

Career
He was educated at Eton College. Lord Ilchester succeeded his uncle in the earldom of Ilchester in 1865 and was able to take his seat in the House of Lords on his 21st birthday in 1868. In January 1874, at the age of only 26, he was appointed Captain of the Honourable Corps of Gentlemen-at-Arms in the Liberal administration of William Ewart Gladstone, a post he held until the government fell the following month. He was admitted to the Privy Council in February of that year. Lord Ilchester never held political office again but served as Lord Lieutenant of Dorset from 1885 to 1905.

Marriage and children
In 1872 Lord Ilchester married Lady Mary Eleanor Anne Dawson (died 1935), a daughter of Richard Dawson, 1st Earl of Dartrey, by whom he had children including:
Giles Fox-Strangways, 6th Earl of Ilchester (1874-1959), eldest son and heir.

Death and burial
He died in December 1905, aged 58, and was buried in the family vault at Melbury Osmond, Dorset. He was succeeded in his titles by his son Giles Fox-Strangways, 6th Earl of Ilchester.

Arms

The arms of the head of the Fox-Strangways family are blazoned Quarterly of four: 1st & 4th: Sable, two lions passant paly of six argent and gules (Strangways); 2nd & 3rd: Ermine, on a chevron azure three foxes' heads and necks erased or on a canton of the second a fleur-de-lys of the third (Fox).

References

1847 births
1905 deaths
People educated at Eton College
Earls of Ilchester
Lord-Lieutenants of Dorset
Members of the Privy Council of the United Kingdom
Members of London County Council
Honourable Corps of Gentlemen at Arms
Henry